R. Nagarajan (born 14 August 1953) is a former Indian cricket umpire. He stood in one ODI game in 1998.

See also
 List of One Day International cricket umpires

References

1953 births
Living people
Indian One Day International cricket umpires
Place of birth missing (living people)